Harumy de Freitas (born June 24, 1995) is a Brazilian artistic gymnast. She competed at the 2012 Summer Olympics and was also Brazil's female artistic gymnastics representative at the inaugural 2010 Summer Youth Olympics.

References

1995 births
Living people
Brazilian female artistic gymnasts
Gymnasts at the 2010 Summer Youth Olympics
Gymnasts at the 2012 Summer Olympics
Olympic gymnasts of Brazil
Sportspeople from Curitiba
20th-century Brazilian women
21st-century Brazilian women